The Dewey County Courthouse in Taloga, Oklahoma was built in 1925.  It was listed on the National Register of Historic Places in 1985.

The courthouse is a three-story building with a flat roof.  Its exterior originally was red brick, with quoins, but was stuccoed over in 1940.  It has a projecting cornice with a plain parapet.  It was designed by Maurice Jayne and was built by the Krioke-Shafer Construction Co.

The listing included two contributing buildings and a contributing structure.  An old jail, from c.1900, and a vault, from c.1910, are the other two resources.  The vault was an addition to the previous courthouse, which burned.

References

National Register of Historic Places in Dewey County, Oklahoma
Government buildings completed in 1925
Dewey County, Oklahoma